Onychopterocheilus is a Palearctic genus of potter wasps.

Species
The following species are classified as members of Onychopterocheilus:

 Onychopterocheilus albopictus (Kriechbaumer, 1869)
 Onychopterocheilus anatolicus (Blüthgen, 1955)
 Onychopterocheilus angustipalpus (Kostylev, 1940)
 Onychopterocheilus atrohirtus (Morawitz, 1885)
 Onychopterocheilus bensoni (Giordani Soika, 1943)
 Onychopterocheilus bytinskii (Gusenleitner, 1970)
 Onychopterocheilus chinensis Gusenleitner, 2005
 Onychopterocheilus crabroniformis (Morawitz, 1867)
 Onychopterocheilus dallatorrei (Morawitz, 1895)
 Onychopterocheilus dementievi (Kostylev, 1940)
 Onychopterocheilus debrochersi (Kostylev, 1940)
 Onychopterocheilus eburneus (Blüthgen, 1955)
 Onychopterocheilus ecarinatus (Morawitz, 1895)
 Onychopterocheilus eckloni (Morawitz, 1885)
 Onychopterocheilus fereniger (Giordani Soika, 1952)
 Onychopterocheilus flaviventris Gusenleitner, 1991
 Onychopterocheilus fuscohirtus (Moravitz, 1895)
 Onychopterocheilus glomeratus (Giordani Soika, 1977)
 Onychopterocheilus grandiceps (Blüthgen, 1955)
 Onychopterocheilus hellenicus (Morawitz, 1885)
 Onychopterocheilus hirtus (Kostylev, 1935)
 Onychopterocheilus inversus (Kostylev, 1935)
 Onychopterocheilus kiritschenkoi (Kostylev, 1940)
 Onychopterocheilus lelegrius Kurzenko, 1976
Onychopterocheilus luteocinctus (Blüthgen, 1955)
 Onychopterocheilus matritensis (Dusmet, 1909)
 Onychopterocheilus menzbieri (Kostylev, 1940)
 Onychopterocheilus mirus Gusenleitner, 1995
 Onychopterocheilus mochii (Giordani Soika, 1942)
 Onychopterocheilus nigropilosus (Kostylev, 1940)
 Onychopterocheilus ornatus (Lepeletier, 1841)
 Onychopterocheilus pallasii (Klug, 1805)
 Onychopterocheilus rectus (Dalla Torre, 1889)
 Onychopterocheilus rongsharensis (Giordani Soika, 1977)
 Onychopterocheilus rudolphae (Kurzenko, 1976)
 Onychopterocheilus rufipes (Gusenleitner, 1971)
 Onychopterocheilus sareptanus (Kurzenko, 1976)
 Onychopterocheilus skorikovi (Kostylev, 1940)
 Onychopterocheilus spheciformis (Gusenleitner, 1970)
 Onychopterocheilus stiziformis (Gusenleitner, 1970)
 Onychopterocheilus turovi (Kostylev, 1936)
 Onychopterocheilus unipunctatus (Lepeletier, 1841)
 Onychopterocheilus waltoni (Meade-Waldo, 1913)
Onychopterocheilus wuhaensis Gusenleitner, 2005

References

 Vecht, J.v.d. & J.M. Carpenter. 1990. A Catalogue of the genera of the Vespidae (Hymenoptera). Zoologische Verhandelingen 260: 3 - 62.

Biological pest control wasps
Potter wasps